Claysville Church is located at the intersection of the Northwestern Turnpike (now US 50) and WV 93 in Claysville, West Virginia, United States.

Claysville Church was built in 1850 under the direction of Daniel Hendrickson and John Fout, local contractor and fund solicitor,  as a church of the Virginia Conference of the United Brethren Church.

Both Union and Confederate soldiers used the church for services during the  Civil War.

In 1946, the local congregation voted to join the Conference in a merger to form the Evangelical United Brethren Church. When the EUB joined the Methodists to form the United Methodist denomination, the Claysville Church disbanded. The church and grounds are owned by the Mineral County Historical Society. The 1954 church Bible, roll hooks from 1856 to 1896, and other historic items are preserved. Additionally, there is a cemetery with many graves sites surrounding three sides of the church.

References

Landmarks in West Virginia
Buildings and structures in Mineral County, West Virginia
Northwestern Turnpike
Mineral County, West Virginia in the American Civil War
Methodist churches in West Virginia